The Unlikely Prince is a 2013 Italian comedy film directed by Alessandro Siani.

Cast
Alessandro Siani as Antonio De Biase
Christian De Sica as Anastasio "Ciambellone"
Sarah Felberbaum as Princess Letizia
Serena Autieri as Jessica Quagliarulo
Lello Musella as Pino
Marco Messeri as the King
Alan Cappelli Goetz as Prince Gherets of Belgium
Salvatore Misticone as Professor Ruotolo
Nello Iorio as Ciro
Gisella Sofio as the old Countess
Sergio Graziani as the old Count
Aldo Bufi Landi as the old barman
Clara Bindi as the old barwoman

References

External links

2013 films
2010s Italian-language films
2013 comedy films
Italian comedy films
Films directed by Alessandro Siani
2010s Italian films